Marcellus Franciscus Gerardus Maria "Marcel" van Grunsven (4 December 1896, Gennep - 24 July 1969, Heerlen) was mayor of Heerlen from 1926 to 1961. He led Heerlen through the Great Depression, the Second World War, and the booming mining years. He didn’t fear personal sacrifice, like salary cuts. Imminently after his installment he turned Heerlen politics around, also eliminating the city's debt.

Together with city planners and architects, for instance Frits Peutz, he bettered the infrastructure of Heerlen, trying to fix social-economical problems. He was also a lover of arts and culture stimulating it in the city. He was made an honorary citizen of Heerlen and the culture prize of Heerlen is named after him (Van Grunsvenprijs).

1896 births
1969 deaths
Mayors of Heerlen
People from Gennep